, also known as is a Japanese actor, screenwriter and stage director.

Filmography

Film
Dive!! (2008) - Hiroya Sakai
Randy's (2009) - Masami
Inu no Kubiwa to Korokke to (2011)
Gakudori (2011)
Ninja Kids!!! (2011) - Shioe Monjirou
Kaizoku Sentai Gokaiger the Movie: The Flying Ghost Ship (2011) - Gai Ikari/Gokai Silver
Kaizoku Sentai Gokaiger vs. Space Sheriff Gavan: The Movie (2012) - Gai Ikari/Gokai Silver
Kamen Rider × Super Sentai: Super Hero Taisen (2012) - Gai Ikari/Gokai Silver, Go-On Red (voice)
Tokumei Sentai Go-Busters vs. Kaizoku Sentai Gokaiger: The Movie (2013) - Gai Ikari/Gokai Silver
Love Gear (2013) - Takuma Sekiguchi
Kamen Rider × Super Sentai × Space Sheriff: Super Hero Taisen Z (2013) - Gai Ikari/Gokai Silver, Kamen Rider Meteor (voice)
Messiah "Shikkoku no Shō" (2013) - Junya Higayama
Shinjuku Swan (2015)
Garo: Kami no Kiba (2017) - Takeru Jakuzure/Zen the Flame Sword Knight
Kaizoku Sentai: Ten Gokaiger (2021) - Gai Ikari/Gokai Silver

Television
Watashitachi no Kyōkasho (2007) - Yuuki Kobayashi
Hanazakari no Kimitachi e (2007) - Itsuki Kamishinjo
Saito-san (2008) - Toshio Narahara
Cafe Kichijoji de (2008) - Jun Ichinomiya
14-sai ~ Chihara Junior Tatta Hitori no Tatakai (2009) - Dai-chan
Gine Sanfujinka no Onna-tachi (2009)
Sign (2011)
Kaizoku Sentai Gokaiger (2011-2012) - Gai Ikari/Gokai Silver
Garo: Yami o Terasu Mono (2013) - Takeru Jakuzure/Zen the Flame Sword Knight
Doubutsu Sentai Zyuohger (2016) - Gai Ikari/Gokai Silver (Episodes 28 and 29)
Short Program (2022) - Tomio Akahori (Episode 3)

Stage
Hakuōki Musical (2012–15) - Tōdō Heisuke
Messiah "Dō no Shō" (2013) - Junya Higayama

Anime
Majestic Prince (2013) - Ataru Suruga
Digimon Adventure tri. (2015–18) - Jo Kido
After the Rain (2018) - Takashi Yoshizawa
Digimon Adventure: Last Evolution Kizuna (2020) - Jo Kido
Trigun Stampede (2023) - Knives Millions

Video games
Ensemble Stars! (2015) - Mitsuru Tenma

References

External links
Official agency profile 

1992 births
Living people
Japanese male film actors
Japanese male stage actors
Japanese male television actors
Japanese male voice actors
Japanese screenwriters
Japanese theatre directors
Male voice actors from Osaka Prefecture